This is a list of 144 species in Scatella, a genus of shore flies in the family Ephydridae.

Scatella species

S. abbreviata Harrison, 1976 c g
S. acutipennis Harrison, 1964 c g
S. aeneiventris (Macquart, 1835) c g
S. albilutea Mathis & Wirth, 1981 c g
S. alticeps Malloch, 1925 c g
S. amnica (Tenorio, 1980) c g
S. angustipennis Wirth, 1955 c g
S. apicalis Wirth, 1957 c g
S. argentea Hendel, 1930 c g
S. argentifacies Wirth, 1955 c g
S. arizonensis Cresson, 1935 i c g
S. atra (Malloch, 1933) c g
S. aurulenta Giordani Soika, 1956 c g
S. australiae Malloch, 1925 c g
S. australis Zatwarnicki & Irwin, 1853 g
S. austrina Mathis & Wirth, 1981 c g
S. balioptera (Mathis & Shewell, 1978) c
S. bicolor Mathis & Wirth, 1981 c g
S. brachyptera Wirth, 1955 c g
S. brevis Harrison, 1964 c g
S. bronneci (Malloch, 1934) c g
S. brunnea Wirth, 1957 c g
S. bryani Cresson, 1926 c g
S. bullacosta Cresson, 1934 c g
S. calida Matsumura, 1915 c g
S. callosicosta Bezzi, 1895 c g
S. catalogana Mathis & Zatwarnicki, 1995 c g
S. cauta Cresson, 1931 c g
S. cheesmanae (Malloch, 1934) c g
S. ciliata Collin, 1930 c g
S. cilipes (Wirth, 1948) c g
S. cinerea Robineau-Desvoidy, 1830 c g
S. cinereifacies (Tenorio, 1980) c g
S. clavipes (Wirth, 1948) c g
S. costalis Hendel, 1932 c g
S. crassicosta Becker, 1896 i c g
S. curtipennis (Becker, 1905) c g
S. decemguttata Wirth, 1955 c g
S. discalis Wirth, 1955 c g
S. ecuadorensis (Mathis, 1979) c g
S. edwardsi Cresson, 1931 c g
S. favillacea Loew, 1862 i c g
S. femoralis (Tenorio, 1980) c g
S. fernandezensis Wirth, 1955 c g
S. fluvialis (Tenorio, 1980) c g
S. furens Cresson, 1931 c g
S. fusca (Macquart, 1835) c g
S. fuscivenosa Wirth, 1957 c g
S. galapagensis Curran, 1934 c g
S. gea Canzoneri & Meneghini, 1979 c g
S. gestiens Cresson, 1931 c g
S. glabra (Mathis & Shewell, 1978) c g
S. gratiellae Canzoneri & Raffone, 1987 c g
S. gregaria Cresson, 1931 c g
S. guttata Zatwarnicki & Irwin, 2018 g
S. guttipennis (Bigot, 1888) c g
S. hawaiiensis Grimshaw, 1901 c g
S. henanensis Zhang & Yang, 2005 c g
S. hirticrus (Mathis & Shewell, 1978) c g
S. ignara Cresson, 1931 c g
S. immaculata Malloch, 1925 c g
S. indistincta Becker, 1896 c g
S. insularis Mathis & Wirth, 1981 c g
S. irrorata (Macquart, 1835) c g
S. kauaiensis (Wirth, 1948) c g
S. kuscheli Wirth, 1955 c g
S. lacustris Meigen, 1830 g
S. lanicrus (Mathis & Shewell, 1978) c g
S. laxa Cresson, 1933 i c g
S. lindbergi Dahl, 1959 c g
S. lutea Wirth, 1955 c g
S. lutosa (Haliday, 1833) c g
S. maculosa Canzoneri & Menghini, 1969 c g
S. major Becker, 1908 c g
S. marginalis Wirth, 1955 c g
S. marinensis (Cresson, 1935) i c g
S. masatierrensis Wirth, 1955 c g
S. mauiensis (Wirth, 1948) c g
S. megastoma (Zetterstedt, 1855) c g
S. melanderi (Cresson, 1935) i c g
S. minima Wirth, 1955 c g
S. nanoptera Wirth, 1955 c g
S. neglecta (Lamb, 1917) c g
S. nelsoni Tonnoir & Malloch, 1926 c g
S. nipponica Miyagi, 1977 c g
S. nitidithorax Malloch, 1925 c g
S. norrisi Mathis & Wirth, 1981 c g
S. notabilis Cresson, 1934 c g
S. nubeculosa Tonnoir & Malloch, 1926 c g
S. oahuense Williams, 1938 c g
S. obscura Williston, 1896 i c g
S. obscurella Hendel, 1930 c g
S. obscuriceps Cresson, 1915 i c g
S. obsoleta Loew, 1861 i c g
S. pallida Wirth, 1955 c g
S. paludum (Meigen, 1830) i c g
S. penai (Mathis & Shewell, 1978) c
S. pentastigma (Thomson, 1869) i c g
S. picea (Walker, 1849) i c g b
S. pilifera Cresson, 1931 c g
S. pilimana Wirth, 1955 c g
S. pruinosa Dahl, 1961 c g
S. pulla Cresson, 1931 c g
S. quadrinotata Cresson, 1933 i c g
S. rivalis Miyagi, 1977 c g
S. rufipes Strobl, 1906 c g
S. sanctipauli Schiner, 1868 c g
S. savegre Mathis & Zumbado, 2005 c g
S. semicinerea (Mathis & Shewell, 1978) c g
S. semipolita (Mathis & Shewell, 1978) c g
S. septemfenestrata Lamb, 1912 c g
S. septempunctata Malloch, 1933 c g
S. setosa Coquillett, 1900 i c g
S. sexnotata Cresson, 1926 c g
S. sexpunctata Malloch, 1933 c g
S. shewelli Mathis & Zartwarnicki, 1995 c g
S. silacea Loew, 1860 c g
S. skottsbergi Wirth, 1957 c g
S. spangleri (Mathis, 1979) c g
S. spinicrus (Mathis & Shewell, 1978) c g
S. stagnalis (Fallén, 1813) i c g
S. stenoptera Wirth, 1955 c g
S. stuckenbergi (Wirth, 1956)
S. sturdeeanus (Lamb, 1917) c g
S. subguttata (Meigen, 1830) c g
S. subvittata Tonnoir & Malloch, 1926 c g
S. tasmaniae Mathis & Wirth, 1981 c g
S. tenuicosta Collin, 1930 c g
S. terryi Cresson, 1926 c g
S. thermarum Collin, 1930 i c g
S. tonnoiri Hendel, 1931 c g
S. triseta Coquillett, 1902 i c g
S. troi Cresson, 1933 i c g
S. unguiculata Tonnoir & Malloch, 1926 c g
S. unguiculosa (Mathis, 1934) c g
S. variofemorata Becker, 1903 c g
S. varipennis Malloch, 1933 c g
S. victoria (Cresson, 1935) c
S. vittata Wirth, 1955 c g
S. vittithorax Malloch, 1925 c g
S. vulgata Cresson, 1931 c g
S. warreni Cresson, 1926 c g
S. williamsi (Wirth, 1948) c g
S. wirthi Hardy, 1965 i c g

Data sources: i = ITIS, c = Catalogue of Life, g = GBIF, b = Bugguide.net

References

Scatella
Articles created by Qbugbot